Anna Maiques Dern (born 3 September 1967) is a former field hockey player from Spain. She was a member of the Women's National Team that won the golden medal at the 1992 Summer Olympics on home soil (Barcelona).

References

External links
 

1967 births
Living people
Sportspeople from Terrassa
Spanish female field hockey players
Field hockey players from Catalonia
Olympic field hockey players of Spain
Field hockey players at the 1992 Summer Olympics
Olympic gold medalists for Spain
Olympic medalists in field hockey
Medalists at the 1992 Summer Olympics
20th-century Spanish women